The Carlos Palanca Memorial Awards for Literature winners in the year 1955 (rank, title of winning entry, name of author).


English division
Short story
First prize: "Ceremony" by Juan C. Tuvera
Second prize: "The Dam" by Edith L. Tiempo
Third prize: "The Other Woman" by Virgilio R. Samonte

One-act play
First prize: "The Long Dark Night" by Magtanggol Asa
Second prize: "Among the Faithless" by Antonio O. Bayot
Third prize: "White Sunday" by Jose M. Hernandez

Filipino (Tagalog) division
Short story in Filipino
First prize: "Paglalayag sa Puso ng Isang Bata" by Genoveva Edroza-Matute
Second prize: "Batingaw" by Elpidio P. Kapulong
Third prize: "Lumamig na Bakal" by Virgilio Blones

One-act play in Filipino
First prize: "Pitong Taon" by Fidel Sicam and Purita Sicam
Second prize: "May Ningning ang Kinabukasan" by Clodualdo Del Mundo
Third prize: "Kamatayan, Iba't ibang Anyo" by Fernando L. Samonte

More winners by year

References
 

Palanca Awards
1955 literary awards